Germany competed at the 2020 Winter Youth Olympics in Lausanne, Switzerland from 9 to 22 January 2020. Germany competed with 90 athletes across 16 sports.

Medalists
Medals awarded to participants of mixed-NOC teams are represented in italics. These medals are not counted towards the individual NOC medal tally.

Alpine skiing

Boys

Girls

Mixed

Biathlon

Boys

Girls

Mixed

Bobsleigh

Cross-country skiing 

Boys

Girls

Curling

Germany qualified a mixed team of four athletes.

Mixed team

Mixed doubles

Figure skating

Couples

Mixed NOC team trophy

Freestyle skiing 

Ski cross

Slopestyle & Big Air

Ice hockey

Girls' tournament 

Summary

Team roster
Leonie Böttcher
Kim Bürge
Liliane Gottfried
Katharina Häckelsmiller
Renee Heyer
Chanel Hofverberg
Julia Kohberg
Lola Liang
Felicity Luby
Celine Mayer
Charlott Schaffrath
Leni Schmidt
Chiara Schultes
Maya Stöber
Lily Teister
Sofia Thierolf
Svenja Voigt

Mixed NOC 3x3 tournament 

Nominated athletes
Daniel Assavolyuk
Matthias Bittner
Leonie Böttcher
Marlon D'Acunto
Chanel Hofverberg
Roman Kechter
Felicity Luby
Celine Mayer
Maya Stöber

Luge

Boys

Girls

Mixed team relay

Nordic combined 

Individual

Nordic mixed team

Short track speed skating

Two German skaters achieved quota places for Germany based on the results of the 2019 World Junior Short Track Speed Skating Championships.

Boys

Girls

Skeleton

Ski jumping

Boys

Girls

Mixed

Ski mountaineering

Individual

Sprint

Mixed

Snowboarding

Snowboard cross

Halfpipe, Slopestyle, & Big Air

Speed skating

Boys

Girls

Mass Start

Mixed

See also
Germany at the 2020 Summer Olympics

References

2020 in German sport
Nations at the 2020 Winter Youth Olympics
Germany at the Youth Olympics